Faroese orthography is the method employed to write the Faroese language, using a 29-letter Latin alphabet.

Alphabet

The Faroese alphabet consists of 29 letters derived from the Latin script:

 Eth  (Faroese ) never appears at the beginning of a word, which means its majuscule form  rarely occurs except in situations where all-capital letters are used, such as on maps.
In handwriting,  is sometimes used.
 While the Faroese keyboard layout allows one to write in Latin, English, Danish, Swedish, Norwegian, Finnish, etc., the Old Norse and Modern Icelandic letter  is missing. If an Icelandic name has to be transcribed,  is common.

Spelling system

Glide insertion
Faroese avoids having a hiatus between two vowels by inserting a glide. Orthographically, this is shown in three ways:
 vowel + ð + vowel
 vowel + g + vowel
 vowel + vowel

Typically, the first vowel is long and in words with two syllables always stressed, while the second vowel is short and unstressed. In Faroese, short  unstressed vowels can only be .

The value of the glide is determined by the surrounding vowels:
 
 "I-surrounding, type 1" – after :   (to wait),   (dead),   (sheep)
 "I-surrounding, type 2" – between any vowel (except "u-vowels" ) and :   (ballad),   (rage).
 
 "U-surrounding, type 1" – after :   (Odin),   (good morning!),   (south),   (to make a trace).
 
 "A-surrounding, type 2"
 These are exceptions (there is also a regular pronunciation):   (eider-duck).
 The past participles always have :   (beloved, nom., acc. fem. pl.)
 Silent

See also
 Faroese language
 Faroese Braille
 Icelandic orthography
 Danish orthography
 Norwegian orthography

References

Bibliography

 

Faroese language
Indo-European Latin-script orthographies